Nelson Stokley (March 12, 1944 – June 5, 2010) was an American college football quarterback and coach. Stokley attended Louisiana State University (LSU) from 1965 to 1967 and helped lead the LSU Tigers to victories in the 1966 Cotton Bowl and the 1968 Sugar Bowl. Stokley was the head coach of the Southwestern Louisiana Ragin' Cajuns from 1986 to 1998 and led the team to a 62–80–1 record. Stokley's 62 win are second most among head coaches in Louisiana Ragin' Cajuns football history, behind Russ Faulkinberry's 66. Stokley and Faulkinberry are tied for the longest tenure as head coach with 13 seasons.

Stokley was also the quarterbacks coach for the Virginia Tech Hokies from 1974 to 1978 and the offensive coordinator for the Clemson Tigers from 1979 to 1985.

Stokley's son, Brandon Stokley, played in the National Football League (NFL).

Head coaching record

References

1944 births
2010 deaths
American football quarterbacks
Clemson Tigers football coaches
Louisiana Ragin' Cajuns athletic directors
Louisiana Ragin' Cajuns football coaches
LSU Tigers football coaches
LSU Tigers football players
People from Kenedy, Texas
Players of American football from Texas
Virginia Tech Hokies football coaches